Micropentila cingulum is a butterfly in the family Lycaenidae first described by Hamilton Herbert Druce in 1910. It is found in Cameroon, the Republic of the Congo and Gabon. The habitat consists of primary forests.

References

Butterflies described in 1910
Poritiinae